GPN-loop GTPase 3 is an enzyme that in humans is encoded by the GPN3 gene.

References

Further reading